Scyles, Skyles, or Scylas, was a Scythian king who lived in the 5th century BC. He is mentioned in the histories of Herodotus as having been an admirer of Greek culture and traditions, which led to his falling out of favor with his people and being executed by his brother.

Name 
 is a Hellenization of the Scythian endonym , itself a later dialectal form of  resulting from a sound change from /δ/ to /l/.

Life 
Scyles was the heir and son of the king Ariapeithes and a Greek woman from Istria. His mother taught him to read and speak the Greek language, which distinguished him from other Scythians, who were illiterate. Because of his mixed heritage, he was ambivalent toward the culture of his father and displayed many Hellenic traits. For example, he built a large house in Pontic Olbia and married a Greek woman, both unheard of practices because the Scythians were largely nomadic and polygamous. He also publicly took part in Bacchic rites, to the anger of other Scythian chiefs.

According to Herodotus, it was because of these unconventional traits that the Scythians rebelled against Scyles, and he was forced to flee from his homeland. He escaped to the Thracian king Sitalces. However, he was pursued by his brother Octamasadas, who raised an army and marched on Thrace. In the midst of the war between the Scythians and Thracians, it was agreed upon by Sitalces and Octamasedes that Scyles would be given over to his brother, in exchange for the release of Sitalces' brother, who was being held prisoner by the Scythians. Scyles was handed over and executed.

Coins bearing the name of Scyles have been found in Niconium, where it is thought that Scyles was buried.

References

See also 

  (translation by George Campbell Macaulay, 1852–1915)
 
 А.Г Загинайло П. О. Карышковский. Монеты cкифского царя Скила [Coins of Scythian King Scylus] // Нумизматические исследования по истории Юго-Восточной Европы: Сборник научых трудов. – Кишинёв: Штиинца, 1990. – С. 3 – 15
 Загинайло А.Г. Литые монеты царя Скила. // Древнее Причерноморье. – Одесса, 1990. – С. 64–71.
 Одесский музей нумизматике. Никоний
 Odessa State Museum of Archaeology

Scythian rulers
People from the Bosporan Kingdom
Iranian people of Greek descent
5th-century BC Iranian people